Gualtiero Marchesi (19 March 1930 – 26 December 2017) was an Italian chef, unanimously considered the founder of the new Italian cuisine and, in the opinion of many, the most famous Italian chef in the world and the one who has contributed most to the development of Italian cuisine, placing the Italian culinary culture among the most important around the world, with the creation of the Italian version of the French nouvelle cuisine.
 
Marchesi was born in Milan, Italy. His parents ran the hotel and restaurant "L'Albergo del Mercato" in Via Bezzecca. It was here that he had his first experiences in the kitchen.

Two of his relatives, Luigi Ghisoni, who had been a chef at the Ritz, Madeira before he joined Marchesi's father running the business, and Domenico Bergamaschi, chef at Albergo del Mercato, were major influences on Marchesi. He identified their ability to prepare traditional recipes perfectly, but also their talent of enhancing the flavour of simple ingredients.

At 17 he left school to work at the Hotel Kulm in St. Moritz. He then studied at a hotel school in Lucerne before returning to work at Albergo del Mercato. There he prepared traditional recipes for lunch but in the evening was given a free hand to experiment. He built a following for his avant-garde cuisine.

Marchesi was an accomplished musician and follower of music. Through this he met his wife, a piano soloist and daughter of a famous soprano.

Marchesi then worked at the "Ledoyen" in Paris, "Le Chapeau Rouge" in Dijon and "Troisgros" in Roanne.  On his return to Milan, he opened a small hotel with his parents, which he ran until 1977.

He then opened his first restaurant on Via Bonvesin de la Riva in Milan. Within a year he earned his first Michelin star, with another following the next year. It took another seven years, but then he eventually won the distinction of a third Michelin star – the first chef in Italy to do so.

In September 1993, Marchesi moved out of Milan to the Franciacorta region, between Bergamo and Brescia. He opened the Ristorante di Erbusco in the Albereta Hotel where his vision of global cuisine took root and flourished.

His restaurant Gualtiero Marchesi di San Pietro all'Orto in Milan, opened in 1998 and is a mix of traditional cooking and modern technology. It is also a cooking academy.

He opened a restaurant in Paris in 2001.  In January 2001, he took over Hostaria dell’Orso, the oldest restaurant in Rome, located in a building dating back to 1400 AD.

In 2011, Marchesi became the first celebrity chef to design two hamburgers and a dessert for McDonald's.

In 2014, Marchesi took part in documentary film 29200 Puthod, l'altra verità della realtà directed by Federico Angi biography of Dolores Puthod international painter.

In May 2017, Marchesi and Director Maurizio Gigola presented the Documentary film Marchesi: The Great Italian at the Cannes Film Festival.

He received the America Award of the Italy-USA Foundation in 2017.

Honours 
 1986 Ambrogino d’Oro
 1989 Personnalité de l’année for gastronomy
 1990 Chevalier des Arts et des Lettres
 1991 Commendatore della Repubblica
 1999 Longobardo d’Oro

Grand Prix ‘Memoire et Gratitude’, awarded by the International Academy of Gastronomy.

He was one of the founders of Euro-Toques, an association of some 3,000 of the world's most important chefs, and was its international president (2000–2002).

As the University Rector of ALMA, which offers the first international master's degree in Italian cuisine, Marchesi hoped to improve Italian catering and restaurant management.

In June 2008, Marchesi denounced the scoring system of Michelin, and "returned" the stars, challenging the voting system of the guide, and claiming to only want to receive comments and ratings. As a result, the 2009 edition "disappears" the Marchesi restaurant from the Michelin guide:
   

 2012 Laurea Honoris Causa in Gastronomy Science from the Universitas of Parma

References

External links 
 
 ALMA - Scuola di Cucina

1930 births
2017 deaths
Businesspeople from Milan
Italian chefs
Head chefs of Michelin starred restaurants
Deaths from cancer in Lombardy